Jalalabad is a village in the Sargodha District of Punjab, Pakistan. It is located at 32°13'54N 72°48'0E, and has an altitude of 190 metres (626 feet).

References

Populated places in Sargodha District